The Buenos Aires ePrix was an annual race of the single-seater, electrically powered Formula E championship, held in Buenos Aires, Argentina. It was first raced in the 2014–15 season.

Circuit

The Buenos Aires ePrix was held on the Puerto Madero Street Circuit, a street circuit located in the Puerto Madero district of Buenos Aires. The circuit was designed by Santiago García Remohí.

Results

References

 
Buenos Aires
Auto races in Argentina
Recurring sporting events established in 2015
2015 establishments in Argentina